Oldřichovice may refer to places in the Czech Republic:

Oldřichovice (Zlín District), a municipality and village in the Zlín Region
Oldřichovice, a village and part of Dešenice in the Plzeň Region
Oldřichovice (Třinec), a village and part of Třinec in the Moravian-Silesian Region
Oldřichovice, a village and part of Ústí nad Orlicí in the Pardubice Region